The Locarno Mine is situated in Kern County, California, USA. Gold and tungsten have been mined there. It was used from 1924 to 1942.

References

External links
Map: 

Gold mines in California
Tungsten mines in the United States
Former gold mines
Former mines in the United States